Paradise Square is a stage musical, with music by Jason Howland, lyrics by Masi Asare and Nathan Tysen, and a book by Christina Anderson, Larry Kirwan and Craig Lucas. Set in New York City during the Civil War and the New York City draft riots, the musical follows conflict between Irish Americans and Black Americans. The production is directed by Moisés Kaufman and choreographed by Bill T. Jones, with intimacy direction by Gaby Labotka. The musical opened on Broadway at the Ethel Barrymore Theatre on April 3, 2022. 

The show received mixed reviews from critics, and earned 10 nominations at the 75th Tony Awards, including Best Musical, with Joaquina Kalukango winning Best Actress.

Production history 
The musical is based on Hard Times, conceived by Kirwan, which was originally presented Off Off Broadway in 2012 at Nancy Manocherian's the cell theatre, under the direction of Kira Simring.

The musical premiered at Berkeley Repertory Theatre in Berkeley, California on December 27, 2018, for a limited run which was extended to March 3, 2019.

It had a pre-Broadway run at the Nederlander Theatre in Chicago from November 2 to December 5, 2021. The production opened to mostly positive reviews.

The musical began previews at the Ethel Barrymore Theatre in New York City on March 15, 2022, prior to an official opening on April 3, 2022. It received mixed reviews and was subsequently closed briefly due to widespread COVID-19 issues amongst the cast and crew.

On July 11, 2022, it was announced the musical would play its final Broadway performance on July 17, due to low ticket sales. After several cast members and stage managers spoke out against the working conditions and unpaid benefits, Actors' Equity announced plans to put producer Garth Drabinsky on the "Do Not Work" list, effectively banning him from producing any future Broadway shows.

An Original Broadway Cast Recording is expected to be released in September, with a national tour currently in development for the 2023-24 season, and international productions also in the works.

Musical numbers
Berkeley (2018)

Act I
"Premonitions"
"Some Folks Do"
"Was My Brother in the Battle?"
"The Five Points"
"Camptown Races"
"We Will Keep the Bright Lookout"
"Ah, May the Red Rose Live Always"
"Nelly Was a Lady"
"Oh, Susanna"
"Gentle Annie"
"I Will Not Die in Springtime"
"I'd Be a Soldier"
"Someone to Love"
"Angelina Baker"
"Hard Times Come Again No More"

Act II
"We Are Coming, Father Abraham"
"Janey with the Light Brown Hair"
"I'm Not That Man"
"Ring, Ring the Banjo"
"I Will Not Die in Springtime” (reprise)
"Angelina Baker” (reprise)
"Paradise Chorale"
"Let It Burn"
"Beautiful Dreamer"

Chicago (2021)

Act I
"Paradise Square" – Nelly, Annie, Willie, Rev., Ensemble
"I'm Coming" – Owen, Washington, Angelina
"Camptown Races" – Owen, Washington, Milton
"Larry’s Goodbye" – Willie, Nelly
"Bright Lookout" – Rev., Dockworkers
"True to a Country" – Tiggens, Mike, Ensemble
"Oh, Susanna" – Ensemble
"Gentle Annie" – Annie, Rev.
"Why Should I Die in Springtime?" – Owen, Ensemble
"I'd Be a Soldier" – Rev., Washington, Ensemble
"Angelina Baker” (part 1) – Washington
"Welcome Home" – Nelly, Ensemble

Act II
"Angelina Baker” (part 2) – Amelia, Uptown Women
"Ring, Ring the Banjo" – Nelly, Annie, Ensemble
"Why Should I Die in Springtime? (reprise) – Owen, Ensemble
"Angelina Baker” (part 3) – Washington, Ensemble
"Someone to Love" – Annie, Nelly
"One Match and One Man" – Mike, Tiggens, Ensemble
"Breathe Easy" – Angelina, Washington, Ensemble
"Hard Times" – Milton, Tiggens, Ensemble
"No More" – Ensemble
"Let It Burn" – Nelly
"Finale" – Ensemble

Broadway (2022)

Act I
"Paradise Square" – Nelly, Annie, Willie, Rev., Ensemble
"I'm Coming" – Owen, Washington, Angelina, Annie, Rev.
"Camptown Races" – Owen, Washington, Milton
"Since the Day That I Met You" – Willie, Nelly
"Bright Lookout" – Rev., Dockworkers
"Tomorrow's Never Guaranteed" – Tiggens, Mike, Ensemble
"I'm Coming" (reprise) – Angelina
"Turn My Life Around" – Nelly, Ensemble
"Gentle Annie" – Annie, Rev.
"Why Should I Die in Springtime?" – Owen, Mike, Ensemble
"I'd Be a Soldier" – Rev., Washington, Ensemble
"Angelina Baker" – Washington
"Heaven Save Our Home" – Nelly, Ensemble

Act II
"Angelina Baker" (reprise) – Uptown Women
"Now or Never" – Nelly, Annie, Ensemble
"Why Should I Die in Springtime?" (reprise) – Owen, Ensemble
"Always on My Mind" – Washington, Ensemble
"Someone to Love" – Annie, Nelly
"The Protest" – Mike, Owen, Tiggens, Ensemble
"Breathe Easy" – Angelina, Washington, Ensemble
"The Riot" – Tiggens, Ensemble
"Chorale" – Nelly, Ensemble
"Let It Burn" – Nelly
"Finale" – Ensemble

Cast and characters

Awards and nominations

References

External links 
 
 

2018 musicals
Original musicals
Broadway musicals
Plays set in New York City
Plays set in the 19th century
Musicals inspired by real-life events
Tony Award-winning musicals